Psychrolutes sio is a species of marine ray-finned fish belonging to the family Psychrolutidae, the fatheads. This is a demersal fish which is found in the eastern Pacific Oceans off Chile and Peru.

References

sio
Fish described in 1980
Taxa named by Joseph S. Nelson